Hem is a village and statistical area (grunnkrets) in Larvik municipality, Norway. Before 1988 it was a part of Tjølling municipality.

The statistical area Hem, which also can include the peripheral parts of the village as well as the surrounding countryside, has a population of 780.

The village Hem is located in the eastern part of the municipality. It is considered a part of the urban settlement Sandefjord, which covers the greater Sandefjord city area and stretches towards Stokke and into peripheral parts of Larvik municipality. The urban settlement Sandefjord has a population of 39,849, of which 705 people live within Larvik.

References

Villages in Vestfold og Telemark
Larvik